Adriano Fegic (born 16 September 1956) is a retired Slovenian footballer who played as a striker.

Club career
Fegic played for HNK Rijeka in the Yugoslav First League from 1977 to 1985. In 1984–85, he was the club's top scorer. He scored four goals in the 1984–85 UEFA Cup, including a brace against both Real Valladolid and Real Madrid.

Honours 
Rijeka
Yugoslav Cup 
Winner (2): 1978, 1979
Balkans Cup
Winner (1): 1978
Runner-up (1): 1979

Primorje
Slovenian Cup
Runner-up (1): 1995-96

Club statistics
Rijeka only.

References

External links

AS Nancy profile
Zgodba Cruyfa s Kantride

1956 births
Living people
People from Postojna
Association football forwards
Yugoslav footballers
Slovenian footballers
Slovenian expatriate footballers
NK Primorje players
HNK Rijeka players
AS Nancy Lorraine players
Limoges FC players
USL Dunkerque players
ASOA Valence players
Yugoslav First League players
Ligue 1 players
Ligue 2 players
Slovenian football managers
Expatriate footballers in France